Spas-Beseda is a rural locality (a selo) in Lavrovskoye Rural Settlement, Sudogodsky District, Vladimir Oblast, Russia. The population was 8 as of 2010. There are 3 streets.

Geography 
Spas-Beseda is located 7 km north of Sudogda (the district's administrative centre) by road. Lavrovo is the nearest rural locality.

References 

Rural localities in Sudogodsky District